Francis William Ogilvy-Grant, 10th Earl of Seafield and 2nd Baron Strathspey (9 March 1847 – 3 December 1888), was a Scottish peer who lived most of his adult life in New Zealand. He was styled Viscount Reidhaven from 1884 to 1888.

Early life
Seafield was born in Ireland in 1847. He was the eldest son of James Ogilvy-Grant, 9th Earl of Seafield and Caroline Louisa Evans, the first of his father's three wives. His mother died on 6 February 1850. After his education, he served as a midshipman in the Royal Navy and then joined the merchant navy.

Life in New Zealand
Seafield arrived in New Zealand in 1870. He bought a farm in the Waiareka Valley in a locality known as Te Aneraki to the west of Oamaru in North Otago. He lost his money through his farming pursuits, and from the late 1870s worked as a labourer in fencing or other available tasks. Some time after the marriage, the family moved to Oamaru.

He stood twice for election in the  electorate to the New Zealand House of Representatives. The first time, he contested the  against the incumbent, Samuel Shrimski. When Shrimski was appointed to the Legislative Council in 1885, Seafield contested the resulting , but lost against Thomas Hislop.

Family
He married his first cousin (her father and his mother were brother and sister), Ann Trevor Corry Evans, on 24 November 1874, at The Bethel in Otago. She was the daughter of Major George Thomas Evans and Louisa Barbara Corry. They had seven children; four girls and three boys. Their youngest daughter, Nina Geraldine (1884–1951), married Sir Lees Knowles, 1st Baronet in 1915.

His cousin, Ian Ogilvy-Grant, 8th Earl of Seafield, died in 1884, and the title devolved to his father. As the heir apparent to the earldom, Seafield became Viscount Reidhaven. When his father died on 5 June 1888, he became the Earl of Seafield in the Peerage of Scotland. A subsidiary title was Baron Strathspey in the Peerage of the United Kingdom.

Seafield died on 3 December 1888 from a heart condition. He is buried at the Oamaru Old Cemetery. He was succeeded by his oldest son in the earldom, James Ogilvie-Grant, 11th Earl of Seafield, who at the time was twelve years old. The 11th Earl was fatally wounded in World War I in 1915, and was succeeded in the barony of Strathspey, the baronetcy of Colquhoun and as Chief of Clan Grant by his younger brother Hon. Trevor Ogilvie Grant. The earldom and the other subsidiary Scottish peerages could be passed on to female heirs, and were inherited by the daughter of the 11th Earl, Nina Caroline Studley-Herbert.

After the 10th Earl had died, the dowager countess lived for some time in Auckland and for some time in Tauranga before moving to England. She died at Brighton on 16 October 1935.

References

1847 births
1888 deaths
Earls of Seafield
19th-century New Zealand people
New Zealand farmers
Unsuccessful candidates in the 1884 New Zealand general election
Grant, Francis William Ogilvy-Grant, 9th Lord
19th-century New Zealand politicians
Scottish emigrants to New Zealand